The 12.8 cm FlaK 40 was a German World War II anti-aircraft gun. Although it was not produced in great numbers, it was reportedly one of the most effective heavy AA guns of its era.

History
Development of the 12.8 cm FlaK 40 began in 1936, with the contract being awarded to Rheinmetall Borsig. The first prototype gun was delivered for testing in late 1937 and completed testing successfully. The gun weighed nearly 12 tonnes in its firing position, with the result that its barrel had to be removed for transport. Limited service testing showed this was impractical, so in 1938 other solutions were considered. Ultimately the firing platform was simplified, based on the assumption it would always be securely bolted into concrete.  Approximately 200 guns were also mounted on railcars, providing limited mobility.

The total weight of the Flakzwilling twin-gun mount system reached 26.5 tonnes, making it practically impossible to tow cross-country. In the end, this mattered little since by the time the gun entered production in 1942, it was used in primarily static, defensive applications. There were four twin mounts on the fortified anti-aircraft Zoo Tower, and they were also on other flak towers protecting Berlin, Hamburg, and Vienna. It is claimed that during the Battle of Berlin the guns on the Zoo Tower were used successfully to support ground forces. The rush to capture the Reichstag led to dozens of tanks being destroyed.

The gun fired a 27.9 kg (61.5-pound) shell at 880 m/s (2,890 ft/s) to a maximum ceiling of 14,800 m (48,556 ft). Compared with the 88 mm FlaK 18 & 36, the FlaK 40 used a powder charge four times as great.

In December 1943, Hitler decided not to introduce the FlaK 40 "During this war".

Variants

 12.8 cm FlaK 40
 12.8 cm Flakzwilling 40/2 The 12.8 cm Flak 40 ordnance on a static dual mounting with a total weight of 26 tonnes, capable of firing 20 rounds per minute. Used mainly on flak towers. Production started in 1942 with 10 tandems produced, another eight in 1943, and in February 1945 a total of 34 were available.
 12.8 cm PaK 40 A derivative anti-tank gun, though rejected in favour of the Krupp 12.8 cm Pak 44 for mass production, but two pieces used to arm the Sturer Emil prototypes.

See also

Weapons of comparable role, performance and era
 120 mm M1 gun, a US gun of almost identical performance
 QF 4.5-inch gun: British 113 mm heavy anti-aircraft gun firing slightly lighter shell
 QF 5.25-inch gun: British 133 mm heavy anti-aircraft gun firing heavier shell
 5"/38 caliber gun: US Navy single/dual purpose shipboard 127 mm heavy anti-aircraft gun firing slightly lighter shell, used on many U.S. Navy ships built during World War II

References

Sources
 Gander, Terry and Chamberlain, Peter. Weapons of the Third Reich: An Encyclopedic Survey of All Small Arms, Artillery and Special Weapons of the German Land Forces 1939–1945. New York: Doubleday, 1979 
 Hogg, Ian V. German Artillery of World War Two. 2nd corrected edition. Mechanicsville, PA: Stackpole Books, 1997

External links

 German Flak 

Anti-aircraft guns of Germany
World War II anti-aircraft guns
128 mm artillery
Rheinmetall
Weapons and ammunition introduced in 1942